The Jehovah's Witnesses in Sweden is a branch of the international Jehovah's Witnesses organization, which is directed by the Governing Body of Jehovah's Witnesses in New York.  The organization has been active in Sweden since 1909, or 1899. The Swedish branch had 23 thousand members in 1992, of which roughly one tenth were immigrants; immigrant members often conducted religious activities in other languages.

The Swedish branch maintained its headquarters in Arboga, before it moved to new Scandinavian headquarters in Holbaek, Denmark, in 2012.

Criticism

The Swedish government and civil authorities have criticized Jehovah's Witnesses for their pacifism and refusal to become involved in military struggles. Conflicts were particularly severe during World War II.

Swedish Jehovah's Witnesses have also been criticized for allegedly not following the Convention on the Rights of the Child.

References

External links
Liedgren, Pernilla. 2007. Att bli, att vara och att ha varit - om ingångar i och utgångar ur Jehovas vittnen i Sverige (To become, to be and to have been: about the Jehovah’s Witnesses in Sweden) Lund universitet, Socialhögskolan, 2007. 231 pages. Lund Dissertations in Social Work, Volume 28. ISSN 1650-3872. Lund University Dissertation, pdf

1909 establishments in Sweden
Sweden
Protestantism in Sweden
Christian organizations established in 1909
Swedish Christian pacifists
Christian denominations in Sweden